Mob Squad is a split album by Dragon Ash, Source, and Mach25; released in 2003. It was released on the Mob Squad label formed between the three bands in 2003 as a sub-label under Victor Entertainment. Mach25 has since been replaced by Endive on the label.

Track listing
Dragon Ash featuring PASSER, HUNTER, Kuro-nee, ONO-G "Mob Squad" – 4:03
Dragon Ash "Revive" – 4:34
Dragon Ash "Massy Evolution" – 4:25
Dragon Ash "Thousand Times" – 3:40
Source "Potential" – 3:04
Source "Sanctuary" – 4:18
Source "Turn Up" – 3:57
Mach25 "Walking With Glow" – 4:26
Mach25 "Beats Of Clapping" – 4:12
Mach25 "Get Your Tomorrow" – 3:45
Mach25 featuring Kj, Kuro-nee, ONO-G "Mob Squad II" – 4:12

2003 albums
Dragon Ash albums